Follistatin also known as activin-binding protein is a protein that in humans is encoded by the FST gene. Follistatin is an autocrine glycoprotein that is expressed in nearly all tissues of higher animals.

Its primary function is the binding and bioneutralization of members of the TGF-β superfamily, with a particular focus on activin, a paracrine hormone.

An earlier name for the same protein was FSH-suppressing protein (FSP). At the time of its initial isolation from follicular fluid, it was found to inhibit the anterior pituitary's secretion of follicle-stimulating hormone (FSH).

Biochemistry 

Follistatin is part of the inhibin-activin-follistatin axis.

Currently there are three reported isoforms, FS-288, FS-300, and FS-315.  
Two, FS-288 and FS-315, are known to be created by alternative splicing of the primary mRNA transcript. FS-300 (porcine follistatin) is thought to be the product of posttranslational modification via truncation of the C-terminal domain from the primary amino-acid chain.

Although FS is ubiquitous its highest concentration has been found to be in the female ovary, followed by the skin.

The activin-binding protein follistatin is produced by folliculostellate (FS) cells of the anterior pituitary. FS cells make numerous contacts with the classical endocrine cells of the anterior pituitary including gonadotrophs.

In the tissues activin has a strong role in cellular proliferation, thereby making follistatin the safeguard against uncontrolled cellular proliferation and also allowing it to function as an instrument of cellular differentiation.  Both of these roles are vital in tissue rebuilding and repair, and may account for follistatin's high presence in the skin.

In the blood, activin and follistatin are both known to be involved in the inflammatory response following tissue injury or pathogenic incursion.  The source of follistatin in circulating blood plasma has yet to be determined, but due to its autocrine nature speculation suggests the endothelial cells lining all blood vessels, or the macrophages and monocytes also circulating within the whole blood, may be sources.

Follistatin is involved in the development of the embryo. It has inhibitory action on bone morphogenic proteins (BMPs); BMPs induce the ectoderm to become epidermal ectoderm. Inhibition of BMPs allows neuroectoderm to arise from ectoderm, a process which eventually forms the neural plate. Other inhibitors involved in this process are noggin and chordin.

Follistatin and BMPs are also known to play a role in folliculogenesis within the ovary.  The main role of follistatin in the oestrus/menstrus ovary, so far, appears to be progression of the follicle from early antral to antral/dominant, and importantly the promotion of cellular differentiation of the estrogen producing granulosa cells (GC) of the dominant follicle into the progesterone producing large lutein cells (LLC) of the corpus luteum.

Clinical significance

Follistatin is being studied for its role in regulation of muscle growth in mice, as an antagonist to myostatin (also known as GDF-8, a TGF superfamily member) which inhibits excessive muscle growth.  Lee & McPherron demonstrated that inhibition of GDF-8, either by genetic elimination (knockout mice) or by increasing the amount of follistatin, resulted in greatly increased muscle mass.  In 2009, research with macaque monkeys demonstrated that regulating follistatin via gene therapy also resulted in muscle growth and increases in strength. This research paves the way for human clinical trials, which are hoped to begin in the summer of 2010 on Inclusion body myositis.

A study has also shown that increased levels of follistatin, by leading to increased muscle mass of certain core muscular groups, can increase life expectancy in cases of spinal muscular atrophy (SMA) in animal models. There is increased risk of type 2 diabetes with increased level of circulating follistatin.

It is also being investigated for its involvement in polycystic ovary syndrome (PCOS), though there is debate as to its direct role in this infertility disease.

References

Further reading

External links 
 
 

Proteins
FOLN domain
KAZAL domain
Myostatin inhibitors